Hans Bobek (17 May 1903, in Klagenfurt – 15 February 1990, in Vienna) was an Austrian geographer. After his studies in geography at the University of Innsbruck, where Johann Sölch—a pupil of Albrecht Penck in Vienna—was his main teacher, he became professor of geography at the University of Vienna (1951–1971). Bobek is noted for his works on cultural and social geography, urban geography as well as on the regional geography of the Near and Middle East, then primarily known as the "Orient". He was, among others, the author of Iran: Probleme eines unterentwickelten Landes alter Kultur. His theory about rural and urban interactions was called Rentenkapitalismus; another important output was the theory of cultural steps (Kulturstufentheorie).

Bobek was elected a member of the Austrian Academy of Sciences in 1953 and the Bavarian Academy of Sciences and Humanities in 1968. In 1978, he received an honorary doctorate from the Ruhr University Bochum.

Works

Monographs
 Bobek, H. (1928): Innsbruck - Eine Gebirgsstadt, ihr Lebensraum und ihre Erscheinung, Engelhorn, Stuttgart, 152 p.
 Bobek, H. (1951): Die natürlichen Wälder und Gehölzfluren Irans, Bonner geographische Abhandlungen 8, Bonn, 62 p.
 Bobek, H. (1952): Südwestdeutsche Studien, Forschungen zur deutschen Landeskunde 62, Remagen, 67 p.
 Bobek, H. (1959): Features and Formation of the Great Kavir and Masileh, Teheran, 63 p.
 Bobek, H. (1962): Iran - Probleme eines unterentwickelten Landes alter Kultur, Diesterweg, Frankfurt a.o., 74 p.
 Bobek, H. and E. Lichtenberger (1966): Wien - Bauliche Gestalt und Entwicklung seit der Mitte des 19. Jahrhunderts, Böhlau, Graz a. Cologne, 394 p.

Selected articles
 Bobek, H. (1927): Grundfragen der Stadtgeographie. Geographischer Anzeiger 28, p. 213–224.
 Bobek, H. (1948): Stellung und Bedeutung der Sozialgeographie. Erdkunde 2, p. 118–125.
 Bobek, H. and J. Schmithüsen (1949): Die Landschaft im logischen System der Geographie. Erdkunde 3, p. 112–120.
 Bobek, H. (1959): Die Hauptstufen der Gesellschafts- und Wirtschaftsentfaltung in geographischer Sicht. Die Erde 90, p. 259–298.
 Bobek, H. (1962): The main stages in socio-economic evolution from a geographical point of view. In: Wagner, P.L. and M.W. Mikesell (eds.): Readings in Cultural Geography, Chicago, p. 218–247. (English translation of the former)

Further reading
 Wiche, K. (ed.) (1963): Festschrift Hans Bobek, Vienna. 
 Wurzer, R. (ed.) (1964): Beiträge zur Raumforschung - Festschrift zum 60. Geburtstag von Hans Bobek, Vienna. 
 Dickinson, R. E. (1969): The makers of modern geography, Routledge & Kegan Paul, London, p. 167–168.
 Lichtenberger, E. (1995): Hans Bobek (1903–1990). In: G. J. Martin (ed.): Geographers: Biobibliographical Studies, Vol. 16, Mansell, London, p. 12–22.
 Fassmann, H. (2009): Bobek, H. In: Kitchin, R. and N. Thrift (eds.): International Encyclopedia of Human Geography, Elsevier, Amsterdam a.o., p. 324–325.

References

 Encyclopædia Britannica

1903 births
1990 deaths
Austrian geographers
Social geographers
Academic staff of the University of Vienna
Members of the Austrian Academy of Sciences
Members of the Bavarian Academy of Sciences
20th-century geographers